Leiferde is a municipality in the district of Gifhorn, in Lower Saxony, Germany. The Municipality Leiferde includes the villages of Dalldorf and Leiferde.

It was the location of the 2022 cargo train incident on the Hanover–Berlin high-speed railway.

References

Gifhorn (district)